Søren Henriksen (born 4 February 1992) is a retired Danish footballer and current Vendsyssel FF.

References

Danish men's footballers
Danish Superliga players
1992 births
Living people
FC Nordsjælland players
HB Køge players
Vendsyssel FF players
FC Helsingør players
Association football defenders
People from Furesø Municipality
Danish 1st Division players
Sportspeople from the Capital Region of Denmark